The Temple - Congregation Adath Israel Brith Sholom is a Reform synagogue located in Louisville, Kentucky. Originally the Adath Israel Temple, it adopted its current name following a merger, but is more commonly known by the informal name The Temple. Prior to merging, the congregations resided in several buildings, with the Adath Israel Temple's third synagogue listed on the National Register of Historic Places.

History
The congregation, the oldest in Kentucky, was chartered in 1842 and has occupied six buildings. It is a founding member of the Union for Reform Judaism.

Brith Sholom—Louisville's third oldest synagogue—was organized in 1880. It was established for those wishing to pray in German, rather than the English used in Adath Israel. It joined the Reform movement in 1920.

In 1976, Adath Israel merged with Brith Sholom. This was motivated by the desire of both groups to improve their physical facilities and to relocate to the eastern part of Jefferson County. For a few years after it was organized as Adath Israel Brith Sholom, it held services in the Brith Sholom building. In 1980, the congregation was able to move into its new sanctuary on Brownsboro Road.

Adath Israel Temple sites

First site 
The congregation built a synagogue on Fourth Street in 1849, which a fire destroyed in 1866.

Second site 
In 1868, the congregation built a new temple at Broadway and Sixth Street. The elaborate domed synagogue was created in an Orientalist style that featured twin towers topped by tall domes and a Torah Ark with a horseshoe arch topped by a similar dome. The architect was H. P. Bradshaw.

Third site 

The congregation's third building was informally known as the "Third Street Synagogue". The Greek Revival structure was designed by architects Kenneth McDonald and J.F. Sheblessy and dedicated on June 3, 1906. The neo-classical building was listed in the National Register of Historic Places in 1975 as a result of the strength and prestige of the architects. In 1977, it was sold to the Greater Bethel Temple, an Apostolic Church.

Brith Sholom Temple sites 
Brith Sholom first owned a building at First and Walnut Streets, which it sold to Congregation Anshei Sfard in 1903 when it moved to Second and College Streets. It moved to the Bonnycastle Mansion at Cowling and Maryland Avenues in 1949.

Merged site 
In 1980, the congregation moved to Brownsboro and Lime Kiln Roads with land purchased in 1966. The temple was built by a joint venture between managing partners Arrasmith & Rapp and Joseph & Joseph.

References

External links
 Congregation Adath Israel Brith Sholom website

Synagogues completed in 1905
German-American culture in Louisville, Kentucky
Synagogues in Louisville, Kentucky
Reform synagogues in Kentucky
Religious organizations established in 1842
Founding members of the Union for Reform Judaism
1842 establishments in Kentucky
National Register of Historic Places in Louisville, Kentucky
Synagogues on the National Register of Historic Places in Kentucky
Greek Revival synagogues
Greek Revival architecture in Kentucky